Jean Miot (30 July 1939 – 18 April 2017) was a French journalist and media executive. He was the associate director of Le Figaro, France's conservative newspaper of record, from 1980 to 1993, and the chairman of its advisory committee from 1993 to 1996. He was the CEO of Agence France-Presse from 1996 to 1999.

Early life
Jean Miot was born on 30 July 1939 in Châteauroux, Berry, France. His father was a piano tuner.

Career
Miot began his career at Centre Presse, a local newspaper in Poitiers in 1964. He was a journalist for France-Antilles in 1968–1970. Between 1974 and 1980, he was the editor-in-chief of France-Antilles, Paris Normandie, Le Berry Républicain, Nord Matin, and Nord éclair.

Miot was the associate director of Le Figaro from 1980 to 1993, and the chairman of its advisory committee of Le Figaro'' from 1993 to 1996. He was also the president of the National Federation of French Press from 1993 to 1996, and the chief executive officer of Agence France-Presse from 1996 to 1999.

Miot was a knight of the Legion of Honour and an officer of the Étoile Civique. He was also a knight of the Confrérie des Chevaliers du Sacavin and a member of the Confrérie des maitres-pipiers. Additionally, he was a commander of the Senegalese National Order of the Lion.

Death
Miot died of a heart attack on 18 April 2017. He was 77.

Works

References

1939 births
2017 deaths
People from Indre
French male journalists
20th-century French journalists
21st-century French journalists
French newspaper editors
Chevaliers of the Légion d'honneur
Recipients of orders, decorations, and medals of Senegal